Mentone was an electoral district of the Legislative Assembly in the Australian state of Victoria from 1945 to 1992. It centred on the south-eastern Melbourne suburb of Mentone.

Members for Mentone

Election results

References

Former electoral districts of Victoria (Australia)
1945 establishments in Australia
1992 disestablishments in Australia
Constituencies established in 1945
Constituencies disestablished in 1992